The Sădurel is a right tributary of the river Sadu in Romania. It discharges into the Sadu near Râu Sadului. It starts on the northern slope of Negovanu Mare peak, Lotru Mountains.

References

Rivers of Romania
Rivers of Sibiu County